Charivari is the folk custom of mock serenading.  It is alternatively spelled shivaree or chivaree and also called skimmington (ride).

Charivari also may refer to:

 Charivari (decorative chain), accompaniment to a Bavarian folk costume
  Charivari (Gruber), a 1981 musical composition
 Charivari (store), a New York City high fashion store from 1967 to 1998
 Charivari, a 1949 novel by American author John Hawkes
 Le Charivari, French magazine of 1832-1937
 The London Charivari, the alternative title to the British humorous magazine Punch (1841-2002)

See also
 Charivarius
 Sharovary
 Shivaree (band)